The South's Oldest Rivalry is the name given to the North Carolina–Virginia football rivalry. It is an American college football rivalry game played annually by the Virginia Cavaliers football team of the University of Virginia and the North Carolina Tar Heels football team of the University of North Carolina at Chapel Hill. Both have been members of the Atlantic Coast Conference since 1953, but the Cavaliers and Tar Heels have squared off at least fifteen more times than any other two ACC football programs. Virginia and North Carolina also have extensive rivalries in several other sports.

The South's Oldest Rivalry is not actually the "oldest" rivalry, as the Auburn-Georgia series (Deep South's Oldest Rivalry) played its first game 245 days before the first North Carolina-Virginia matchup. But nonetheless it is so named not only because of the extraordinary age and length of the series, but because of the immense early success of both programs and the great regional importance of their earliest games: between 1889 and 1902, either Virginia or North Carolina claimed a southern championship in twelve out of fourteen years. 

The preeminence of this rivalry in early southern football is demonstrated by the fact that North Carolina beat both Georgia and Auburn in their own states by the combined score of 82–0, before edging out Virginia by four points and claiming the 1898 southern championship. When Virginia had first played one of those "Deep South" teams the year prior, a Georgia fullback died in Atlanta. Virginia had the upper hand overall in the early rivalry with North Carolina, and therefore the entire region, claiming no fewer than twelve southern championships through 1908. The game was still considered a regional attraction in 1928, with a sitting President and First Lady making the eight-hour round trip from the White House to attend the sold-out rivalry game in Charlottesville on that Thanksgiving Day.

The South's Oldest Rivalry started 1–1 after playing twice in 1892 (once in Atlanta). All games played between 1893 and 1916 were at "neutral site" locations in the Commonwealth of Virginia – Richmond and Norfolk – but after a two-year hiatus for World War I, the two programs have played every year since 1919 and have alternated between their home stadiums in Chapel Hill (at Kenan Memorial Stadium since 1927) and Charlottesville (at Scott Stadium since 1931). Between 1910 and 1950, the South's Oldest Rivalry was consistently played as the last game of the season for both programs, and nearly always on Thanksgiving Day.

Virginia–Carolina is, as of 2021, tied with the Georgia–Auburn game as the second-most played rivalry game of the Power Five conferences, after the Paul Bunyan's Axe rivalry between Wisconsin and Minnesota. Among Football Bowl Subdivision rivalry games, this game is also tied with Auburn–Georgia as the most played rivalry in the South, but moreover has been played five more times than the Army–Navy Game to stand as the most-played FBS rivalry game in the East. When including FCS rivalries, the Capital Cup has been played the most times in the South and The Rivalry the most times in the East (and nation).

Series history 
Long being the most played game among all Football Bowl Subdivision series in the Southeastern United States, the annual game became known over the years simply as the South's Oldest Rivalry. It is also the oldest series of the highest division on the eastern seaboard. The 2018 meeting marked the 123rd edition of this game (played continuously since 1919), five more than the Army–Navy Game for the longest FBS series in the East, but now only equal to the "Deep South's Oldest Rivalry" (Georgia–Auburn) which was recently played twice in the same year in 2017, for the longest FBS series in the South.

The game was first twice played in 1892 (Virginia won the first, and North Carolina the second, splitting the southern title). Virginia then claims a southern championship for every year of 1893–1897, with North Carolina gaining a Southern Intercollegiate Athletic Association title in 1895 (only loss to Virginia) and 1898. Both overshadowed by Sewanee in 1899, Virginia again went on a tear from 1900 until 1905 when North Carolina pulled the upset. Between 1889 and 1902, either Virginia (11) or North Carolina (2) claimed a southern championship every year except two (the aforementioned 1899 and 1891, claimed by Trinity).

Among ACC rivalries, both programs of the South's Oldest Rivalry actually played against Trinity and Wake Forest years before playing against each other. North Carolina first played (and lost to) Trinity in 1888, after also losing against Wake Forest. Virginia first played and defeated Wake Forest in 1889, and first played and defeated Trinity in 1890. Trinity, in particular, played both Carolina and Virginia annually or close to it through 1894. However, Trinity abandoned the sport of football entirely between 1895 and 1919, as Wake did likewise from 1895 through 1907. Trinity renamed itself Duke University in 1924, two years after the Blue Devils became an annual rival of the Tar Heels. Wake Forest also was an annual rival of Carolina between 1908 and 2003 (after which, ACC realignment matched them more sporadically). In contrast, Virginia did not play Duke and Wake Forest regularly again until 1951 and 1955, respectively.

The Virginia–Carolina rivalry reached its modern crescendo during the 1990s when George Welsh and Mack Brown strolled the sidelines and turned both sides of the rivalry into top ACC programs with nationally ranked teams more years than not. In the 1990–1997 period that both sides were consistently near the top of the ACC standings, Welsh and the Cavaliers won five games to Brown and the Tar Heels' three. Welsh finished 7–3 overall against Brown including two wins in 1988 and 1989 while the Tar Heels were still deep in rebuilding mode (finishing 1–10 in Brown's first two years). After building up the program, Brown left Carolina for Texas after the 1997 season. Soon after his departure, both programs seemed to enter a slow decline and Welsh retired in 2000.

In 2010, UNC broke a long losing streak in Charlottesville, UNC's first road win in the series since 1981. It ended what many UNC fans mockingly described as the "Charlottesville Curse" which lasted one year short of three decades. UVA led the overall series from 1893 to 1944, but UNC has since led from 1945 onward. Virginia closed to within two games in 2009 (or a tie if including the 1956 forfeit) but UNC then proceeded to win seven games in a row (2010–2016) as the Tar Heels went undefeated in the rivalry during the entire Virginia tenure of Mike London. Notwithstanding that extended losing streak, as of 2018 Virginia is 22–13–1 in the rivalry since 1983.

The second-most played game for these teams, as of 2018, is fifteen fewer games (108 as of 2018) for North Carolina's in-state rivalry against NC State, and the second-most played series for Virginia is twenty-three fewer, 100 games as of 2018, for its own in-state rivalry against Virginia Tech (for the Commonwealth Cup).

Nature of the rivalry
There is considerable historical lineage and academic standing between the two universities involved. The University of Virginia was founded by third President of the United States and founding father Thomas Jefferson, whereas the University of North Carolina was the first operational state university in the United States. William Faulkner was Writer-in-Residence at UVA, and Peter Taylor was on the UVA faculty and retired in Charlottesville.  National Poet Laureate Rita Dove serves on the UVA faculty, and UVA is the alma mater of Edgar Allan Poe and eight winners of the Pulitzer Prize (including Edward P. Jones, Ron Suskind, Virginius Dabney, and five others). UNC is the alma mater of Thomas Wolfe (who wrote about the 1919 game in his posthumous novel The Web and the Rock), Walker Percy, and Shelby Foote. President Woodrow Wilson attended UVA and was President of its Jefferson Literary and Debating Society, whereas President James K. Polk attended UNC and was a Senator in its Dialectic and Philanthropic Societies. Assassinated Presidential candidate Robert F. Kennedy was a graduate of UVA's law school.

When the 1985 Richard Moll book was published listing the original eight "Public Ivies," public colleges with rigorous academic standards, there were only two sharing a common athletic conference: the University of Virginia and the University of North Carolina. For at least nine consecutive years, U.S. News & World Report has ranked UVA second and UNC fifth among all public universities, and they are first and second in the east. The two were also the first future members of the Atlantic Coast Conference to be elected to the prestigious Association of American Universities: UVA was elected in 1904 and UNC in 1922. Only Duke University would join them, in 1938, before the ACC was formed in 1953. They have since also been joined in the AAU by two newer ACC institutions: Georgia Tech (joined ACC in 1978; elected to AAU in 2010) and the University of Pittsburgh (elected to AAU in 1974; joined ACC in 2013).

The rivalry is often called a "Gentlemen's Rivalry."  One reason for this moniker is the prestigious image, both academically and socially, of both universities throughout the region. The institutions' student bodies also tend to somewhat mirror one another from a social and academic standpoint.

Contributing factors

Famous spectators

Probably the most famous spectator of this rivalry was present on Thanksgiving Day in 1928. Sitting President of the United States Calvin Coolidge and First Lady Grace Anna Goodhue Coolidge were among the full capacity of 20,000 spectators to watch this rivalry game in Charlottesville. They were not graduates of either university (he had attended Amherst College and she the University of Vermont) but came purely out of interest. North Carolina won narrowly, 24–20, over Virginia in the eighth consecutive game in the series to be decided by a single touchdown or less. It was one of the last of these rivalry games played at Lambeth Field, as Scott Stadium was constructed in 1931 to accommodate more spectators. Coolidge had declined to run for a second term, and just sixteen days before the game Coolidge's Secretary of Commerce, Herbert Hoover, had won the 1928 presidential election to replace him.

"Benedict Ronald"
Often considered the best high school football player of all time from the state of Virginia, and the only junior ever to be named the nation's top high school quarterback by USA Today, Ronald Curry announced a verbal commitment to George Welsh's Virginia program on September 4, 1997, during ESPN coverage of that night's game between Virginia and Auburn. With the commitment from Curry, Welsh declined to recruit Michael Vick, whose own stellar career in the same high school district was largely overshadowed by Curry's.  While Curry's high school football coach, 12-time state champion Mike Smith, was happy that Curry would attend Virginia, Curry's AAU basketball coach Boo Williams told Curry he should decommit and go to a "basketball school" like North Carolina to get a better shot at the NBA.

Curry decommitted from Virginia on signing day, causing him to be called "Benedict Ronald" and "Benedict Curry" by the Virginia faithful who blamed him not only for the program losing out on his own services, but for losing out on the unrecruited Vick. Curry was lampooned in the media, earning the title "Sports Jerk of the Year" in the nationally syndicated Tank McNamara comic strip.  

At North Carolina, Curry did not become the dominant college football player that many had expected him to be but still set UNC records including most career passing yards and most career total yards. Curry played basketball for two seasons at UNC and started at point guard.

He was drafted by the Oakland Raiders and played seven years in the NFL after converting to wide receiver. As of 2019, he is in his fourth year as the wide receivers coach for the New Orleans Saints.

Game results

In 1956, North Carolina forfeited this game due to using an ineligible player. However, UNC and various other sources today count the game as a win.

Other sports
Virginia and North Carolina have won NCAA Championships in numerous sports other than football. In three particular men's sports they have established heated rivalries, and in each of these sports both sides have won one or more NCAA Championships. As of October 2019, a total of 28 national titles have been won between these two rivals in men's basketball, men's lacrosse, and men's soccer. Moreover, all six programs of the rivalries below have had great success not only historically but also recently: every program involved has won at least one NCAA Championship in the 2010s.

Men's basketball
Both Carolina and Virginia have NCAA Championship programs in men's basketball. Virginia's Tony Bennett holds a 10–7 edge against North Carolina's Roy Williams as of 2019. However, Carolina leads the overall series 131–57 as of the same date. Carolina has won seven national championships--six NCAA Championships (1957, 1982, 1993, 2005, 2009, 2017) and one national championship that predates the NCAA (1924). Virginia has won one NCAA Championship (2019), for a total of eight national titles between the two programs. Carolina defeated Virginia in the Championship Game of the 2016 ACC tournament, and went on to win the 2017 NCAA tournament the following year. Returning the favor, Virginia defeated Carolina in the Championship Game of the 2018 ACC tournament, and went on to win the 2019 NCAA tournament the following year.

Men's lacrosse
Both Virginia and Carolina have NCAA Championship programs in men's lacrosse. Virginia leads the overall series 30–21 as of 2020. Virginia has won seven NCAA Championships (1972, 1999, 2003, 2006, 2011, 2019, 2021) and Carolina has won five NCAA Championships (1981, 1982, 1986, 1991, 2016). Virginia also has two national championships (1952, 1970) which predate NCAA oversight, for a total of fourteen national titles between the two programs.

Men's soccer
Both Virginia and Carolina have NCAA Championship programs in men's soccer. As of 2019, North Carolina leads Virginia 40–36–10 across all men's soccer competitions. However, Virginia has won seven NCAA Championships (1989, 1991, 1992, 1993, 1994, 2009, and 2014) while North Carolina has won two NCAA Championships (2001, 2011) for a total of nine national titles between the two programs.

See also 
 List of NCAA college football rivalry games
 List of most-played college football series in NCAA Division I

Notes 

1Virginia won the first game played in 1892.
2North Carolina won the second game played in 1892.

References

College football rivalries in the United States
North Carolina Tar Heels football
Virginia Cavaliers football
University of North Carolina at Chapel Hill rivalries